The Canberra International Film Festival (CIFF) is an annual film festival held in Canberra, Australia. It is a cinema celebration across an 11-day program in October/November each year. It is a showcase of films from Australia and around the globe.

In addition to screening feature films and documentaries, there is always a suite of additional events such as Q&A sessions, workshops and panel discussions with directors, producers, actors and the broad range of artists involved in the filmmaking process.

History 
The University of Canberra was the initiator of the Canberra International Film Festival. For each Festival from 1996 until 2001, either through its Convocation or directly, the university provided the artistic direction, and was also the promoter, manager and underwriter of the festival.

In 2002, as part of a comprehensive plan to restructure the Canberra International Film Festival and secure its future, ownership was transferred to an Incorporated Association. The Canberra International Film Festival is a not-for-profit organisation supported by local and federal government, corporate sponsors and cultural partners.

Artistic Directors 
 Michael Sergi (1996 – 2008)
 Simon Weaving (2009 – 2012)
 Lex Lindsay (2013 - 2014)
 Alice Taylor (2016)
 Andrew Pike (2017)

CIFF Audience Awards

Notes

Other film festivals 
 Canberra Short Film Festival

Film festivals in Australia
Festivals in Australian Capital Territory
Film festivals established in 1996
Events in Canberra